Thudufushi (sometimes spelled Thundufushi), formerly one of the uninhabited islands of Alif Dhaal Atoll (South Ari Atoll), Maldives, was developed into a 70 room 5 star resort called Diamonds Thudufushi Beach and Water Villas in 1990. It is managed by Planhotel Hospitality Group. Some of the best diving points in the Maldives are located in the Ari Atoll.

Name
In Divehi, "Thudufushi" means "Point Island".

Geography
Surrounded by a lagoon and long stretches of white, sandy beach, and encircled by a reef, it is the only resort on the island. It measures about  – . Seaplane transfer from Male International Airport is a scenic, 25-minute flight.

Reef
Due to the rise in temperature caused by La Niña, the coral reef had suffered but is starting to recover.

Gallery

References

External links
 Resort website

Islands of the Maldives
Resorts in the Maldives